Raimo Majuri (born 30 July 1943) is a Finnish skier. He competed in the Nordic combined events at the 1964 Winter Olympics and the 1968 Winter Olympics.

References

External links
 

1943 births
Living people
Finnish male Nordic combined skiers
Olympic Nordic combined skiers of Finland
Nordic combined skiers at the 1964 Winter Olympics
Nordic combined skiers at the 1968 Winter Olympics
People from Kemijärvi
Sportspeople from Lapland (Finland)
20th-century Finnish people